Smith-Rourke House is a historic home located at East Patchogue in Suffolk County, New York.  It was built in 1837 and is a large two story, five bay, generally square dwelling that measures approximately 32 by 40 feet.  The house features a low sloping hipped roof of tin with a central cupola and cross gables on all four sides, characteristic of the Italianate style. It also features a profusion of heavy, bold Greek Revival style ornamentation.  Also on the property is a small carriage shed.

It was added to the National Register of Historic Places in 1989.

References

Houses on the National Register of Historic Places in New York (state)
Italianate architecture in New York (state)
Houses completed in 1837
Houses in Suffolk County, New York
National Register of Historic Places in Suffolk County, New York